Jenny Lumet (born February 2, 1967) is an American actress and screenwriter. She is the daughter of director Sidney Lumet and granddaughter of Lena Horne. Lumet is perhaps most known for writing the original screenplay of the 2008 Jonathan Demme film Rachel Getting Married.

Early life and education 
Lumet was born on February 2, 1967, in New York City. She is the second daughter born to director Sidney Lumet and journalist/writer Gail Buckley (Gail Buckley Jones). On her paternal side, she is of Polish-Jewish ancestry. Her paternal grandfather was Baruch Lumet, who was a Yiddish theatre actor. On her maternal side, she is African-American, European and Native American with extensive roots in post-colonial America. Her maternal grandmother was singer Lena Horne. In 1984, Lumet graduated from Dalton School.

Career 
Lumet began working in the entertainment industry as an actress. She appeared in small roles in two films directed by her father, Deathtrap and Running on Empty, before playing the role of Nancy Bosch in his 1990 film Q&A. Lumet wrote the screenplay for the 2008 Jonathan Demme film, Rachel Getting Married. In 2016, Lumet had a CBS drama with a pilot commitment. Lumet was a script doctor for the 2017 version of The Mummy, and was a drama teacher at the Manhattan Country School in New York City.
In 2018, Lumet joined the staff of Star Trek: Discovery as a consulting producer, and was subsequently promoted to co-executive producer. She co-wrote "Runaway", the first of the Short Treks mini-episodes. More recently, she signed an overall deal with CBS Studios.

Personal life 
Lumet was married to actor Bobby Cannavale from 1994 until their divorce in 2003. Their son is the actor Jake Cannavale. Lumet has a daughter with second husband Alexander Weinstein, whom she married in 2008.

On November 30, 2017, Lumet alleged music producer Russell Simmons sexually assaulted her in 1991. In response, Simmons said his recollection of the sexual incident differed from Lumet's and he was removing himself from leadership positions at his businesses.

Awards 
 2008: Film Independent Spirit Awards, Best First Screenplay (nomination) for Rachel Getting Married
 2008: New York Film Critics Circle Awards, Best Screenplay for Rachel Getting Married
 2008: Toronto Film Critics Association Awards, Best Screenplay for Rachel Getting Married
 2009: NAACP Image Awards, Outstanding Writing in a Motion Picture (Theatrical or Television) for Rachel Getting Married

Filmography 
 1975: Everybody Rides the Carousel – Stage 4 (voice)
 1982: Deathtrap – Stage Newsboy
 1988: Running on Empty – Music Girl
 1988: Tougher Than Leather – Pam
 1990: Q&A – Nancy Bosch
 1994: Assassination – Stephanie Merrin (Short)
 1995: DodgeBall – Claudette Mitty
 2008: Rachel Getting Married – Writer
 2017: The Mummy – Writer (screen story)
 2021: Clarice – Co-creator, executive producer
 2022: The Man Who Fell to Earth – Co-creator, executive producer, writer
 2022: Star Trek: Strange New Worlds – Co-creator, executive producer, writer

References

External links 
 

1967 births
Actresses from New York City
African-American actresses
African-American Jews
African-American screenwriters
Screenwriters from New York (state)
American people of African descent
American people of English descent
American people of Polish-Jewish descent
American women screenwriters
Living people
Writers from New York City
21st-century American women writers
Dalton School alumni
Lumet family
21st-century American screenwriters
21st-century African-American women writers
21st-century African-American writers
20th-century African-American people
20th-century African-American women